The McKaskle Hills are a group of moderately low, rocky coastal hills between Rogers Glacier and the Mistichelli Hills, on the eastern margin of the Amery Ice Shelf, Antarctica. They were delineated in 1952 by John H. Roscoe from air photos taken by U.S. Navy Operation Highjump (1946–47), and named by him for H.A. McKaskle, an air crewman on Operation Highjump photographic flights over coastal areas between 14°E and 164°E longitude.

References

Hills of Princess Elizabeth Land
Ingrid Christensen Coast